A4Tech Co., Ltd. is a Taiwanese computer hardware and electronics company headquartered in New Taipei, Taiwan. A4Tech Co., Ltd. was founded in 1987 by Robert Cheng. The first activity of the company was the production of computer mice. In the future, the range of products was replenished with other types of computer peripherals.

From the moment of its foundation to the present day, the company is private. The number of owners and their shares in the authorized capital were not disclosed. The company also does not publish profit and loss statements, sales data and other financial statements.

Products 
PC peripherals:

 Keyboards, mice (wired, wireless, Bluetooth models)
 Webcams
 Computer speakers
 Headphones and headsets
 Merchandise and other products for gamers

History 
CEO Robert Cheng established A4Tech in 1987.

As of 2015, A4Tech has turned its attention to the North American market with a new gaming brand – Bloody.

Bloody Gaming 

In 2011, A4Tech launched its secondary PC gaming brand – Bloody Gaming. Initial products focused around integration of optical switches into gaming peripherals - specifically keyboards and gaming mice.

At the CES 2018 expo in Las Vegas, Bloody introduced the third generation of Light Strike technology (dubbed LK Libra) and launched its full upgraded keyboard portfolio by February 2018.

References 

1987 establishments in Taiwan
Companies based in Taipei
Electronics companies of Taiwan
Electronics companies established in 1987
Taiwanese companies established in 1987